WXBH-LP (92.7 FM) was a non-commercial FM radio station licensed to serve Louisville, Kentucky. The station was licensed to Brycc House Inc., a 501(c)(3) non-profit charitable organization. WXBH-LP's license was cancelled on June 14, 2013.

WXBH was licensed as a low-power FM (LPFM) station under FCC regulations, limiting it to an effective radiated power of no more than 100 watts. It shared the 92.7 MHz frequency with WFHS-LP, an LPFM station licensed to the Fern Creek Traditional High School Alumni Association. The stations were broadcast from separate transmission facilities located in the Fern Creek community in southeastern Jefferson County, Kentucky.

The station was granted a construction permit by the Federal Communications Commission (FCC) on April 29, 2005, was assigned the WXBH-LP call letters on May 23, 2005., went on the air on June 15, 2007, applied for a license to cover on June 29, 2007, and was granted its FCC license on December 23, 2009.

References

External links
 
WXBH-LP service area per the FCC database

Defunct radio stations in the United States
Radio stations established in 2007
Radio stations disestablished in 2013
Defunct mass media in Louisville, Kentucky
XBH-LP
XBH-LP
2007 establishments in Kentucky
2013 disestablishments in Kentucky
Defunct community radio stations in the United States